Argostemma ophirense is a species of herbaceous flowering plant in the family Rubiaceae. It can be found on ground or on rocks in the rainforests of Thailand, Malaysia, and Borneo.

References

Argostemmateae
Taxa named by Joseph Dalton Hooker
Plants described in 1882